Harry or Harold Fletcher may refer to:

Harold Fletcher (botanist) (1907–1978), English botanist
Harold Oswald Fletcher (1903–1996), Australian palaeontologist
Harry Fletcher (footballer, born 1873) (1873–1923), English footballer
Harry Fletcher (Scottish footballer) (1879–1917), Scottish amateur footballer for Queen's Park
Harry Fletcher (politician) (1910–1990), Australian politician

See also
Henry Fletcher (disambiguation)